Jaime Federico Said Camil de Saldanha da Gama (born 22 July 1973) is a Mexican actor, singer and television personality. He is best known for his roles as Fernando Mendiola in La Fea Más Bella and Rogelio de la Vega in Jane the Virgin, the latter of which brought him two nominations for the Critics' Choice Television Award for Best Supporting Actor in a Comedy Series.

Early life
Camil was born on 22 July 1973 in Mexico City, Mexico. He is the son of Jaime Camil Garza, a Mexican businessman with partial Egyptian heritage, and Cecilia Saldanha da Gama, a Brazilian singer. He earned a bachelor's degree in business administration from Universidad Anáhuac; studied acting in New York, Los Angeles, and Mexico; and took classical opera training in Italy.

Career
Camil started his career in 1993 as a radio commentator on Radioactivo 98.5. In 1995, he made his small-screen debut as a host in El show de Jaime Camil. He continued as a host in TV Azteca's Qué nochecita con Jaime Camil (1996) and Televisa's Operación triunfo (2002). In 2009, he co-hosted Aventura por México with Javier Poza, and in 2010 he hosted the Mexican edition of the game show, El Gran Show.

In 1999, he released his first album Para estar contigo, which took him to major cities in Mexico, South America, and the United States. After participating in El Ultimo Adios (The Last Goodbye), a tribute to victims of 9/11, Camil released his second disc, Una vez más, in 2002. The singles Dime and Muriendo por ti rose to #17 and #24 Billboard's charts. In 2014 he stood on the other side of the microphone for the first time, directing the music video Perdon for the group Barston. Several of his albums went platinum after their release.

His work in the telenovela industry began with Mi destino eres tú (2000), followed by Mujer de madera (2004). The role which finally brought Jaime Camil universal renown was in the romantic comedy telenovela La fea más bella (2006–2007). His interpretation of "Don Fernando Mendiola" earned him a nomination for a  Best Actor award in the Premios TVyNovelas. After Las tontas no van al cielo (2009) with Jacqueline Bracamontes, his next telenovela took him to South America for the Argentine/Mexican co-production of Los Exitosos Pérez (2009–2010) in which he played twins. 2012 brought Por Ella Soy Eva with Camil's most technically challenging role, and one of his most memorable. His character Juan Carlos disguised himself as an outspoken older woman reminiscent of Tootsie. La fea más bella and Por Ella Soy Eva comprised two of the three highest-rated telenovelas since Mexico started keeping records. A year later, his guest appearance on an episode of Devious Maids helped propel it to the third-highest-rated show of the series.

His film debut was in Delfines in 1997, but it wasn't until 2003 when film producers noticed his talent in acting. He co-starred in three different movies filmed in just a year; Puños rosas (rel. 2004), Zapata (rel. 2004) and 7 Días (rel. 2005). For his interpretation of "Tony" in 7 Días, Camil was awarded the 2006 Diosa de plata as Best Supporting Actor. 2007 saw the release of I Love Miami. He participated in the Chilean movie All Inclusive. He went on to play the lead in two romantic comedies, Recien cazado filmed in Baja California and Paris, and Regresa, both released in the winter of 2008–09. Camil voiced the role of Barry in the Spanish-language edition of the animated movie Bee Movie. In the Spanish version of Open Season he dubbed the voice of Elliot, the Mule Deer. He is cofounder and spokesman of the Short Shorts Film Festival Mexico,  . and has starred in shorts Mariana made in Tepito and Volver, volver.

Camil has often said that his favorite venue is the stage. In 2005, he played Nestor Castillo in the Broadway-bound musical The Mambo Kings. Later in 2005 he performed in Latinologues on Broadway. His work in Mexican theater includes the role of Bernardo in a revival of West Side Story (2004), for which he won the Palmas de Oro award for Best Supporting Actor in a Musical. In 2007 he played the lead, Father Silvestre, in El diluvio que viene, which won the APT and ACPT awards for Best Actor in a Musical. He has played colorful characters such as Captain Hook in the musical Peter Pan (2007), and the Genie in the musical Aladdin (2008).  In the summer of 2016, Jaime starred as Billy Flynn in the musical Chicago on Broadway in the Ambassador Theater. Camil played Flynn in an extended run from May 31 to July 31, 2016.

In the fall of 2014, he began acting in the role of Rogelio De La Vega, the biological father of Jane Villanueva and a telenovela star, in the CW network comedy, Jane the Virgin.

In 2018, he starred the main role of Panchito Pistoles on Legend of the Three Caballeros, which is based on the 1944 film The Three Caballeros, as well as taking over the role of the TaleSpin character Don Karnage for his appearance in the 2017 DuckTales reboot.

In 2019, he voiced the character Globgor in the final season of Star vs. the Forces of Evil.

In 2021, he played the role of Doc Lopez in the first season of Schmigadoon!

Personal life
Camil divides his time between Los Angeles and Mexico City with his wife, model Heidi Balvanera, and their two children. He has two half-siblings and three step-siblings. He speaks four languages: Spanish, English, Portuguese, and French.
His older half-sister, is an actress and model, with an extensive career in Mexico and other Latin American countries.

Filmography

Film

Television

As producer

Discography
(1999) Para estar contigo
(2002) Una vez más

Accolades

References

External links
 Official Website
 

1973 births
Living people
20th-century Mexican male actors
20th-century Mexican male singers
21st-century Mexican male actors
21st-century Mexican male singers
Male actors from Mexico City
Male actors of Brazilian descent
Mexican male film actors
Mexican male musical theatre actors
Mexican male stage actors
Mexican male telenovela actors
Mexican male voice actors
Mexican people of Brazilian descent
Mexican radio presenters
Singers from Mexico City
Universidad Anáhuac México alumni